MatlinPatterson is a distressed securities fund that participates in distressed and credit opportunities on a global basis. The firm was established in 2002 as a spinout from Credit Suisse First Boston. It is headquartered in New York City and has offices in London and Hong Kong. MatlinPatterson was founded by David Matlin and Mark Patterson. MatlinPatterson, through MatlinPatterson Global Advisers, manages private equity vehicles with a distressed-for-control mandate as well as an open-ended strategy seeking non-control credit investment opportunities.

MatlinPatterson is managed by co-founder David Matlin, together with Managing Partner, Peter Schoels and Michael Lipsky.  Mr. Schoels has served as Managing Partner since 2009 and is also responsible for management of the illiquid investment portfolio. Mr. Lipsky, who joined the Firm in early 2011, is responsible for management of the liquid investment portfolio. Co-founder Mark Patterson serves as Chairman of MatlinPatterson Group.

History
In 1994, David Matlin and Mark Patterson formed the Global Distressed Securities Group at Credit Suisse to invest proprietary capital across a wide range of control and non-control distressed opportunities on a global basis.  In 2001, the Distressed Group launched its first private equity fund to invest client capital in distressed-for-control situations and wound down its proprietary investment activity. In 2002, David Matlin and Mark Patterson formed MatlinPatterson as an independent entity to succeed to this business and has since sponsored successor distressed-for-control funds in 2003 and 2007, raising approximately $9 billion in total capital commitments across these three funds, with the most recent Fund being a $5 billion Fund raised in 2007.

In 2007, David Matlin and Matlin Patterson formed an affiliate to leverage the distressed control expertise by offering a non-control liquid trading strategy.  At the beginning of 2013, the control and non-control businesses were combined into a single investment management platform under the overall supervision of Mr. Matlin. This interdisciplinary approach, blending trading and private equity skills to invest in distressed opportunities, enables the Firm to flexibly source transactions under a variety of economic and financial environments.

Through several distressed debt cycles, MatlinPatterson and its investment professionals have invested over $14 billion of proprietary capital, distressed-for-control funds and non-control distressed funds in more than seventy-five control and 380 non-control distressed opportunities in more than twenty-five countries.

In December 2012, Allied World Assurance, a publicly traded insurance company, acquired a minority interest in the liquid credit business of MatlinPatterson. As part of the transaction, Allied World agreed to invest $500 million in MatlinPatterson's funds.

The MatlinPatterson Group collectively represents the MatlinPatterson Distressed business and a full spectrum of credit focused investment strategies including (i) trading long and short positions in investment-grade credit instruments such as public and private corporate bonds, notes, loans, debentures, leverage loans, mortgages, convertible debt, governmental bonds, municipal securities and other evidences of indebtedness and derivatives based thereon, (ii) trading in structured mortgage-backed and asset-backed securities and (iii) senior bank debt collateral asset management services.

MatlinPatterson distressed business investments
MatlinPatterson's distressed business pursues illiquid control and activist non-control investment strategies, as well as a range of liquid trading strategies.
The firm's control strategies are characterized by its controlling or active participation in distressed companies and their restructurings require a long-term investment outlook. Since 1994, MatlinPatterson and its predecessor entities have invested over $8 billion across 66 control investments.
MatlinPatterson's liquid trading strategies seek to generate profits from changes in the price of securities or claims, with the firm remaining largely uninvolved in a restructuring process or distressed company.  Since 1994, MatlinPatterson and its predecessor entities have invested approximately $6 billion across 380 passive and active non-control strategies.
In July 2009, MatlinPatterson—which acquired Nortel bonds after the company filed for bankruptcy, becoming one of Nortel's largest bondholders—participated in the auction for Nortel's CDMA and LTE wireless assets. Ericsson ultimately outbid NokiaSiemens and MatlinPatterson, paying almost double the initial "stalking horse" bid of $650 million.

In 2007, MatlinPatterson acquired a controlling stake in XL Health, a Baltimore based Medicare Advantage health plan focused on senior citizens with chronic diseases. In 2011, the company was acquired by United Healthcare after having taken EBITDA from ($112) million in 2007 to a $259 million in 2011. This deal won the operational excellence award for the healthcare segment from Private Equity International magazine.

The firm was also a significant purchaser of WorldCom bonds.  The company later was renamed MCI Worldcom and later more simply to MCI prior to its subsequent acquisition by Verizon.

In 2001, MatlinPatterson became the majority owner of Huntsman Corporation, which at the time was the 5th largest chemicals company worldwide, and later became a public company. MatlinPatterson has also made several investments in the energy sector, becoming the largest shareholder of NRG Energy,  which was the country's third largest independent power company, as well as acquiring several power generation facilities in the Southeastern United States.

In 2008, the company purchased a controlling stake in home construction company Standard Pacific Corp, which merged into CalAtlantic Homes in 2015. Between January 2009 and November 2010, MatlinPatterson invested $1 billion to become the controlling shareholder of Flagstar Bancorp of Troy, Michigan.

MatlinPatterson Investment Strategies

MatlinPatterson Global Opportunities 
MatlinPatterson's control strategies are characterized by control or active participation in distressed companies and their restructurings through investments that require a long-term investment outlook. The team invests in senior and subordinated, secured and unsecured debt and equity, in both public and private companies.

MatlinPatterson's liquid credit strategies seek to generate absolute returns with low volatility through non-investment grade credit across all periods of the default cycle. The strategies seek to exploit inefficiencies in selected markets and capitalize on situations that are outside mainstream investment opportunities.

MatlinPatterson Credit Trading 
MatlinPatterson's credit trading strategies take a trading-oriented, liquid approach to the performing credit markets.  The firm's strategies seek to generate consistent, equity-like returns while limiting volatility and the potential tail risk that can be associated with the credit asset class.  The team's security selection, portfolio construction and risk management processes seek to create an asymmetric return profile that is long volatility and that relies on price movements to generate returns.  The team's risk management process is focused on capital preservation utilizing a tight stop-loss discipline.  The strategies incorporate the use of corporate and municipal bonds, credit default swaps, and other credit-related instruments.

MatlinPatterson Securitized Credit 
MatlinPatterson's securitized credit strategies take a liquid relative value approach, targeting credit investments across the residential mortgage-backed securities (RMBS), commercial mortgage-backed securities (CMBS) and asset-backed securities (ABL) markets.  The firm seeks to generate returns through a comprehensive asset selection process and an active trading strategy.  The team utilizes proprietary analytics to drive the evaluation of investment opportunities and performs rigorous stress tests across a variety of scenarios.  Investments are based on a disciplined bottom-up approach centered upon an assessment of the credit quality of the assets that constitute the underlying collateral of the relevant security or instrument.

MatlinPatterson Senior Credit 
MatlinPatterson's senior credit strategy focuses on senior bank debt.  This strategy involves the construction and management of high current income portfolios of senior bank loans.  The firm applies a fundamental bottom-up credit research investment process driven by disciplined and continuous credit monitoring.  MatlinPatterson seeks to mitigate credit risk by focusing on issuers with at least 50% junior capital to the secured bank loans and consistent core cash flow generation (EBITDA).  Historically this approach has achieved lower volatility returns by minimizing capital losses from default and default-like events.

References

External links

MatlinPatterson (company website)

Private equity firms of the United States
Financial services companies established in 2002
Investment banking private equity groups
Privately held companies based in New York City
2002 establishments in New York City